EDITED (formerly EDITD) is a retail intelligence company headquartered in London, England with offices worldwide including New York and Texas. The company produces real-time data analytics software intended for brands and retailers. Its products range across Market Intelligence to monitor the retail market worldwide for apparel, homeware and beauty products; Enterprise Intelligence to provide business analytics across ecommerce, physical stores and omnichannel teams; and Automation that combines signals from Market and Enterprise Intelligence.  Its software is primarily used by apparel buyers, traders and merchandisers; however, anyone across a retail business from design to C-suite can use EDITED.

About
EDITED is a Retail Intelligence Platform designed to help retailers increase margins and generate more sales. Its founding product of the same name uses web crawlers and Artificial Intelligence technology such as Computer Vision to collect product and commercial data on over +3.7 billion SKUs generated by the online retail industry. With over 10 years of historical data, the Market Intelligence software allows users to analyze that data in order to gain competitive insights into the market. Some key components of the software are its ability to display product metrics for retail products currently on the market, including items’ pricing and sell out rates. In addition, the market product lets its users evaluate competitor assortment and industry-wide trend trajectories. This also includes a communications archive, where brands and retailers can pinpoint peak periods for seasonal updates and promotions. Data can help retailers decide which items to discount and how to set dynamic prices.

Since its acquisition of DynamicAction, a leading internal retail analytics company, the EDITED product family includes an Enterprise Intelligence component, which connects 150+ enterprise and cloud data systems so users can pinpoint areas of opportunities across its business operations. With deep prescriptive business analytics, retailers and brands have insight into the profit centric metrics to take action on, including for demand, inventory, promotions, traffic and reviews. These product insights are overlaid directly on a retailer's website and merchandising tools.

The combined signals from internal enterprise and external market data fuel the EDITED Automation arm to expedite decision making across a retail business. These triggers can adjust for product sorting, pricing, replenishment, targeted campaigns and more.

With a global customer reach across 40 countries, EDITED is used by over 200 leading brands and retailers on six continents in countries as diverse as South Africa, Australia, China, Russia, Italy, Germany, South Korea, the United Kingdom and the United States.

EDITED was founded by Geoff Watts and Julia Fowler in 2009. The company is backed by Wavecrest Growth Partners, Beringea UK and Hermes GPE. To date it has raised $34 million.

In 2012, the company was featured in The Guardian’s list of ‘East London’s 20 Hottest Tech Startups’. In April, 2015 it was included on Business Insider’s list of ‘25 Companies That Are Revolutionizing Retail’. The company also placed third in Fast Company’s 2014 list of ‘The World’s Top 10 Most Innovative Companies in Style’.

In 2017, it won Retail Week's Retail Tech Supplier of the Year, and was ranked one of the Five Best Companies to Work for in Europe by Meritocracy.

In 2021, EDITED acquired leading retail analytics company, DynamicAction.

References

Technology companies based in London
British companies established in 2009